mg, originally called MicroGnuEmacs (and later changed at the request of Richard Stallman), is a public-domain text editor that runs on Unix-like operating systems. It is based on MicroEMACS, but intended to more closely resemble GNU Emacs while still maintaining a small memory footprint and fast speed. An expanded version of the original is included as part of OpenBSD, where it is maintained, and snapshots of the OpenBSD version are available in the native package management trees of many other systems, including MacPorts, FreeBSD Ports, pkgsrc and Debian.

History
 Nov 16, 1986: First release to mod.sources, according to the README
 Mar 3, 1987: First release (mg1a) via comp.sources.unix
 May 26, 1988: Second release: (mg2a) via comp.sources.misc
 Jan 26, 1992: Linux port released by Charles Hedrick. This version later makes its way onto tsx-11, Infomagic, and various other Linux repositories.
 Feb 25, 2000: First import into the OpenBSD tree, where it is currently maintained
 May 20, 2001: OpenBSD's mg is imported into FreeBSD Ports

See also

 List of text editors
 Comparison of text editors

References

External links
OpenBSD's mg man page.
Han Boetes' portable version of OpenBSD's mg.  
Browsable source code of mg at BXR.SU OpenGrok

Unix text editors
Free text editors
Emacs
OpenBSD
Public-domain software with source code